St. Mary's Cathedral of the Immaculate Conception is the seat of the Roman Catholic Archdiocese of Portland in Portland, Oregon, United States and serves Roman Catholics in western Oregon.

History
In 1925 Archbishop Alexander Christie authorized construction of a new cathedral at the corner of NW 18th and Couch streets as he struggled with a mortal illness. Parishioners and clergy from all over the archdiocese responded. In less than a year, on February 14, 1926, the new church opened. The first services were held on Friday, February 19, 1926.

In 1993, a restoration study was completed.  Thomas Hacker and Associates, a Portland architectural firm, was asked to a draft detailed restoration plan for the cathedral and a larger master plan that would provide for long-range improvements around the cathedral in keeping with the Catholic tradition of service. The cathedral was restored for the 150th anniversary of the Portland Archdiocese in 1996. The restoration included seismic strengthening, electrical, heating, and lighting updating, as well as liturgical and artistic modifications.

Art
The marble statues of Mary and the Sacred Heart against the north walls of both transepts were carved in Switzerland and brought to the earlier 3rd and Stark Street cathedral by the Benedictine monks, who later founded Mount Angel Abbey. The Narthex doors' glass etching contains subtle symbols of the seven Sacraments. The transept windows date from the 1870s and were brought from two earlier cathedrals, as well as the Archbishop's Chair.

Stations of the Cross
The stations of the cross are original to the cathedral.

Architectural Style and Details
The architectural plans were by Jacobberger and Smith. The architectural style is Twentieth Century Romanesque and Byzantine, with a red tiled gable roof, cast-stone Corinthian columns, and a square tower with copper cornices.  The marble floor in the apse was laid in 1926. The new marble on the floor in the remainder of the cathedral is a pattern of several Italian marbles. The doors are white oak in cast bronze on the exterior.  Letters on the granite sign are Roman majuscules from the Trajan inscription in Rome.  The coat of arms on the sign is of the Archdiocese of Portland in Oregon.

Bells
The three bells of the tower were cast in the late 1880s and originally installed in the former cathedral at Third and Stark Streets. They were manually-pealed until 2017, when the bells and yokes were refurbished and fitted with linear ringing motors. They sound at the pitches of D¹, F¹, and Ab¹.

See also
List of Catholic cathedrals in the United States
List of cathedrals in the United States

References

External links
Official Cathedral Site
Roman Catholic Archdiocese of Portland Official Site

Roman Catholic Archdiocese of Portland in Oregon
Mary Portland, Cathedral of Saint
Mary in Portland, Cathedral of Saint
Mary in Portland, Cathedral of Saint
1925 establishments in Oregon
Historic district contributing properties in Oregon
National Register of Historic Places in Portland, Oregon
Churches on the National Register of Historic Places in Oregon
Northwest District, Portland, Oregon